Margaret of Joinville (1354–1418), was a French noblewoman.  From 1365 until her death, she was the ruling Lady of Joinville and Countess of Vaudémont.

Family 
Her father was Henry, Lord of Joinville.  He was Count of Vaudémont as Henry V; he died when she was seven years old.  Her mother was Marie of Luxembourg.

Marriages and issue 
In 1367, she married John of Châlon, Lord of Montaigu (1340-1373).  This marriage was childless.

In 1374, she married Count Peter of Geneva.  In 1378, Peter's brother Robert was elected antipope as Clement VII.  Peter died in Robert's service in 1392. This marriage was also childless.

In 1392, Margaret married for the third time, to Frederick I (1368-1415), the younger brother of Duke Charles II of Lorraine.  Together they had three children:
Antoine (1397-1456), who succeeded as Count of Vaudémont, his grandson René II became Duke of Lorraine
Elisabeth (1400-1458), who married in 1412 to Philipp I of Nassau-Weilburg, and
Margaret, who married Thibault II of Blamont.

References 
 Henri-François Delaborde: Jean de Joinville et les seigneurs de Joinville, Librairie Picard et fils, Paris, 1894, p. 215, Online

People of the Hundred Years' War
House of Vaudémont
Counts of Vaudémont
1354 births
1418 deaths
French countesses
14th-century French people
14th-century women rulers
15th-century women rulers